There Goes Kelly is a 1945 American comedy mystery film directed by Phil Karlson and starring Jackie Moran, Wanda McKay and Sidney Miller. It was produced and distributed by Monogram Pictures. It is a remake of the 1940 film Up in the Air, and also acts as a sequel to the 1943 film Here Comes Kelly.

Cast
Jackie Moran as Jimmy Kelly
Wanda McKay as Anne Mason
Sidney Miller as Sammy Cohn
 Ralph Sanford as Police Lt. Marty Phillips
 Dewey Robinson as 	Detective Delaney
 Jan Wiley as 	Rita Wilson aka Gladys Wharton
 Anthony Warde as 	Bob Farrell
 Harry Depp as J. B. Hastings
 George Eldredge as 	John Quigley
 Edward Emerson as 	Martin
 Gladys Blake as Stella - Switchboard Operator
 Jon Gilbreath as Tex Barton
 Pat Gleason as 	Pringle
 Donald Kerr as 	Bowers
 Charles Jordan as 	Wallis
 Terry Frost as 	Dick Stevens - Orchestra Leader
 Ralph Linn as 	Norris

References

Bibliography
 Etling, Laurence. Radio in the Movies: A History and Filmography, 1926–2010. McFarland, 2011.
 Fetrow, Alan G. Feature Films, 1940-1949: a United States Filmography. McFarland, 1994.
 Miller, Don. "B" Movies: An Informal Survey of the American Low-budget Film, 1933-1945. Curtis Books, 1973.

External links

1945 films
American mystery films
1945 mystery films
Monogram Pictures films
Films directed by Phil Karlson
American black-and-white films
1940s English-language films
1940s American films
American sequel films
Remakes of American films